R.K. Educational School is a coeducational school in Bulandshahr district, Uttar Pradesh, India affiliated to CBSE Board.  Its student body numbers approximately 1000, and its facilities include a swimming pool and a library.   the principal is Mrs. NIDHI GOYAL

TA.

External links
R.K. Educational School at PublicInfopath.com

References 

2002 establishments in Uttar Pradesh
Bulandshahr district
Educational institutions established in 2002
Schools in Uttar Pradesh
Bulandshahr